Cossmannica exesa is a species of sea snail, a marine gastropod mollusk in the family Pyramidellidae, the pyrams and their allies.

Distribution
This marine species occurs off the coasts of Queensland, Australia, within the Great Barrier Reef and other various marine areas nearby.

References

External links
 To World Register of Marine Species

Pyramidellidae
Gastropods described in 1959